The 2017–18 CERH European League was the 53rd season of Europe's premier club roller hockey tournament organised by CERH, and the 21st season since it was renamed from European Champion Clubs' Cup to the CERH Champions League/European League.

Reus Deportiu were the defending champions. Barcelona won the trophy for a record 22nd time, winning 4–2 over Porto, who lost their 9th consecutive final and 11th overall, 7 of which against Barcelona.

Format changes
There are not any format changes in the competition system but, as new, the CERH introduced possession clocks as in basketball. Each possession would have a maximum of 45 seconds.

Team allocation

Federation ranking

For the 2017–18 CERH European League, the associations are allocated places according to their Federation points, which takes into account their performance in European competitions from the 2013–14 to the 2015–16 seasons. Points are calculated by dividing the total of points accumulated by the number of participating teams.

Participation in the European League is reserved to that federations that have an effective capacity to organize annually their own national championships. They all will have at least one place. For allocating the other nine places, the D'Hondt method is used with the coefficient of each federation.

In case of resigns, priority will be given according to the order established by the D'Hondt method.

Teams
League positions of the previous season shown in parentheses (TH: Title holders). As English champions King's Lynn resigned to its place, following the allocation criteria, Italian Follonica occupied its vacant berth.

Participant teams were confirmed on 19 September 2017.

Round dates
The schedule of the competition is as follows.

Draw
The 16 teams were allocated into four pots, with the title holders, Reus Deportiu, being placed directly as head-team of the Group A. The other three seeded teams will be from the three top ranked federations according to these priorities:
 National champions of those leagues.
 Highest ranked teams.

In each group, teams played against each other home-and-away in a home-and-away round-robin format.

The group stage will be drawn on 23 September 2017 in Lisbon.

Pots
Below are the participating teams (with their points at the CERS ranking). Title holders and the champions of the three top leagues in the ranking were assigned to pot 1, while the rest of the pots were established by nationalities.

Notes

Group stage

The 16 teams were allocated into four pots, with the title holders, Reus Deportiu, being placed as seeded team in the Group A automatically. The other 3 seeded teams, Porto, Barcelona and Amatori Lodi, were automatically placed in groups B, C and D, respectively. The rest of the teams were drawn into four groups of four, with the restriction that teams from the same association could not be drawn against each other.

In each group, teams played against each other home-and-away in a home-and-away round-robin format.

A total of six national associations were represented in the group stage.

Group A

Group B

Group C

Group D

Knockout phase
The knockout phase comprises a quarter-final round and the final four tournament. In the quarter-finals, group stage winners play against group stage runners-up, the latter hosting the first of two legs. The winners qualify for the final four, which will take place at the ground of one of the four finalists.

Quarter-finals

|}

Final Four bracket
The Final Four will be played on 12 and 13 May in Porto, Portugal.

Semifinals

Final

See also
2017–18 CERS Cup
2017 CERH Continental Cup
2017–18 CERH Women's European Cup

References

External links
Comité Européen de Rink-Hockey (official website)

Rink Hockey Euroleague
CERH European League
CERH European League